Madeenaguda is a neighbourhood of  Hyderabad, Telangana, India. It is located between Chanda Nagar and Hafeezpet and Miyapur in the north western part of the city. This neighbourhood has grown intensively after the IT boom in the Madhapur area.

Commercial area
There are many shops catering to all budgets. There is a big market at Miyapur, which is quite popular among people of surrounding suburbs. It is just 11 km away from Hi-tech city therefore attracting the IT people.

madeenaguda consists various malls like GSM mall and many textile shops

Transport
TSRTC connects Madeenaguda with all parts of the city. 

The closest MMTS Train station is at Chanda Nagar and Hafeezpet.

The closest Metro station is at Miyapur

References 

Neighbourhoods in Hyderabad, India